Brookshire may refer to:
Brookshire, Texas

See also
Brookshire Brothers
Brookshire Grocery Company